HD 128311 c is an exoplanet located approximately 54 light-years away in the constellation of Boötes. This planet orbits in an eccentric orbit at 1.74 AU from its star (HD 128311). The planet has a minimum mass of 3.22 , and astrometric observations in 2014 revealed its true mass to be 3.789 .

References

External links
 
 

Boötes
Giant planets
Exoplanets discovered in 2005
Exoplanets detected by radial velocity
Exoplanets detected by astrometry